SMS G38 was a 1913 Type Large Torpedo Boat (Großes Torpedoboot) of the Imperial German Navy (Kaiserliche Marine) during World War I, and the 14th ship of her class.

Service

Built by Germaniawerft in Kiel, Germany, she was launched in December 1914.

G38 was assigned to the First Torpedo Boat Flotilla of the High Seas Fleet of the Kaiserliche Marine.  When she participated in the Battle of Jutland she was assigned to escort the battlecruiser SMS Lützow.  In this action, Lützow was severely damaged such that she was unable to return to German waters.  After assisting SMS G37, G40 and V45 in the evacuation of survivors, G38 was ordered to scuttle Lützow by launching two torpedoes into her.

After the end of hostilities, G38 was interned at Scapa Flow in November 1918 and scuttled along with most of the fleet on 21 June 1919.  She was salvaged for scrap by Ernest Cox in 1924.

References
Emmerich "Großes Torpedoboot 1913 technical data" (2003) german-navy.de

G38
1914 ships
Ships built in Kiel
World War I torpedo boats of Germany
World War I warships scuttled at Scapa Flow
Maritime incidents in 1919